Walter Payton, Jr. (August 23, 1942 – October 28, 2010) was an American jazz bassist and sousaphonist.

Payton was born in New Orleans, Louisiana. He played with the Preservation Hall Jazz Band, the French Market Jazz Hall Band and the Young Tuxedo Brass Band, and led his own group called the Snap Bean Band. His recording credits include Lee Dorsey's "Working in the Coal Mine", and Payton variously worked with Aaron Neville, Harry Connick Jr., Champion Jack Dupree and Chuck Carbo. Peyton appeared on SNL (Walter Payton/Walter Payton)

Payton died in his hometown of New Orleans, after an illness, aged 68. He was the father of jazz trumpet player Nicholas Payton.

References

1942 births
2010 deaths
Jazz musicians from New Orleans
African-American musicians
American jazz double-bassists
Male double-bassists
American male jazz musicians
Preservation Hall Jazz Band members
Young Tuxedo Brass Band members
20th-century African-American people
21st-century African-American people